The Yeah Yeah Yeahs are an American indie rock band formed in New York City in 2000. The group is composed of vocalist and pianist Karen O (born Karen Lee Orzolek), guitarist and keyboardist Nick Zinner, and drummer Brian Chase. They are complemented in live performances by second guitarist David Pajo (formerly of Slint and Tortoise), who joined as a touring member in 2009 and replaced Imaad Wasif, who had previously held the role. According to an interview that aired during ABC's Live from Central Park SummerStage series, the band's name was taken from modern New York City vernacular.

The band has recorded five studio albums; the first, Fever to Tell, was released in 2003. The second, Show Your Bones, was released in 2006 and was named the second best album of the year by NME. Their third studio album, It's Blitz!, was released in March 2009. All three albums earned the band Grammy nominations for Best Alternative Music Album. Their fourth album, Mosquito, came out in April 2013, and Cool It Down followed in September 2022.

History

Formation and Fever to Tell (1990s–2004)
Karen O and Brian Chase first met as students at Oberlin College in Ohio in the late 1990s, where Chase was a jazz student at the conservatory. Karen then transferred to New York University and met Zinner, a student at Bard College, in a local bar, where they formed an "instant connection". During this time, they also shared a loft with future members of the band Metric. Orzolek and Zinner formed an acoustic duo called Unitard but soon decided to "shake things up a bit" by forming a "trashy, punky, grimy" band modeled after the art student, avant-punk bands Karen O was exposed to at Oberlin. After the drummer they initially recruited bowed out, Chase joined the line-up.

The band wrote a slew of songs at their first rehearsal and soon wound up supporting The Strokes and The White Stripes, earning a significant buzz for their arty and garage punk scene. In late 2001, the Yeah Yeah Yeahs released their self-titled debut EP, which they recorded with Boss Hog's Jerry Teel, on their own Shifty label. Early the next year, they stepped into the international spotlight, appearing at South by Southwest, touring the U.S. with Girls Against Boys, and Europe with Jon Spencer Blues Explosion, and headlining their own U.K. tour. Wichita Recordings distributed the group's EP in the U.K. and Touch and Go reissued it in the States.

In 2003, the band released their debut album, Fever to Tell, which received several strong critical reviews and sold more than 750,000 copies worldwide. The album's third single, "Maps", received significant airplay on alternative radio. In 2010, Rolling Stone ranked "Maps" as 386th in their list of the 500 Greatest Songs of All Time. The video for their 2004 single "Y Control" was directed by Spike Jonze. In October 2004, the band released their first DVD, Tell Me What Rockers to Swallow. The DVD included a concert filmed at The Fillmore in San Francisco, all of the band's music videos to date, and various interviews. Later the same year, they were featured in Scott Crary's documentary Kill Your Idols.

In November 2009, NME rated Fever to Tell the No. 5 Best Album of the Decade.

Show Your Bones and Is Is EP (2005–2007)

The Yeah Yeah Yeahs' second album, Show Your Bones, was released on March 28, 2006. Karen O told online zine Drowned in Sound, "Show Your Bones is what happens when you put your finger in a light socket", crediting "9-year old antigenius wonder-kid Drake Barrett for the insight." The first single from the album, "Gold Lion", was released on March 20, 2006, reaching number 18 in the Official UK Singles Chart. It has been noted by Leah Greenblatt that "Gold Lion" sounds startlingly similar to "No New Tale To Tell" from 1980s alternative band Love and Rockets.

The band toured throughout Europe and the United States during much of 2006, and also helped to curate an edition of the British All Tomorrow's Parties festival.

In December 2006, the album was named second best album of the year by NME magazine, and "Cheated Hearts" was voted 10th best song. Rolling Stone magazine named Show Your Bones the 44th best album of 2006, while Spin magazine ranked it number 31 on their 40 best albums of 2006.

Yeah Yeah Yeahs' third EP, titled Is Is, was released on July 24, 2007. It includes 5 previously unreleased songs and a short film, which was recorded and filmed at the Glasslands Gallery in Brooklyn, NY. The songs were written in 2004, during the Fever To Tell tour, and performed live often. Three of the five tracks were featured on the Tell Me What Rockers to Swallow DVD.

It's Blitz! (2008–2009)
The Yeah Yeah Yeahs' next album was released in March 2009 and titled It's Blitz!. The band says the album sounds different from their previous ones but "still [sounds] like Yeah Yeah Yeahs". It was originally set to be released on April 13, but following an internet leak on February 22, the band's label, Interscope, pulled the release date closer to reduce the leak's impact. The album spawned three singles: "Zero", "Heads Will Roll," and "Skeletons."

It's Blitz! was named second best album of 2009 by Spin Magazine and third best by NME, along with "Zero" from the album listed as the best track of the year by both.

Mosquito and hiatus (2011–2016)
On December 9, 2011, Karen O reported to NME that she had been working on new music with the band, hinting a new album was possibly in the making. On January 14, 2013, it was announced via their official Facebook page that the new album would be titled Mosquito. It was released on April 16, of the same year. The album features production by TV on the Radio's Dave Sitek, Nick Launay, and LCD Soundsystem's James Murphy. The first single, "Sacrilege", was released on February 15, 2013. "Despair" was released as the second single on July 23, 2013.

In December 2014, the Yeah Yeah Yeahs went on hiatus. In 2016, the band received writing credits on the Beyoncé single "Hold Up".

Return in 2017
On June 20, 2017, the Yeah Yeah Yeahs announced that they would be headlining the Austin "Sound on Sound" festival on November 10, adding: "Watch for more news coming soon" The Sound on Sound festival was subsequently cancelled.

On May 26, 2018, the Yeah Yeah Yeahs played at All Points Festival in Victoria Park, London.

Reissue of Fever to Tell
The Yeah Yeah Yeahs released a deluxe remastering of their debut album Fever to Tell on October 20, 2017, through Interscope / UMe. It features previously unreleased demos, B-sides, and other rarities from the era.

In a press release, the band announced, "A friend of a friend kept asking if we were ever gonna put Fever to Tell out on vinyl as it hasn't been on vinyl in 10 years. That's not right. So here it is on vinyl for the first time in 10 years plus a time capsule of photos, demos (1st ever recorded,) a mini film documenting our near downfall and other fun memorabilia, from the turn of the century NYC, made with love + the usual blood, sweat + tears of Yeah Yeah Yeahs."

To celebrate the reissue, the band performed a small series of shows in October and November at The Fonda Theatre in Los Angeles, California, the Fox Oakland Theatre in Oakland, California, and Kings Theatre in Brooklyn, New York.

Cool It Down (2022)
In June 2022, the band announced that they would be releasing the album Cool It Down on September 30, making it their first record in nine years. They released the first single, "Spitting Off the Edge of the World", featuring Perfume Genius, on June 1. On September 29, 2022, the band performed their second single, "Burning", on Jimmy Kimmel Live! as part of the show's weeklong residency at the Brooklyn Academy of Music.

Musical style
The Yeah Yeah Yeahs' style has been described as "an art-rock trio who made an edgy post-punk, dancefloor-friendly racket that mixed up Blondie, Pretenders, and Siouxsie and the Banshees".

Awards and nominations

Antville Music Video Awards

|-
| rowspan="2" | 2006
| rowspan="2" | "Gold Lion"
| Best Cinematography
| 
|-
| rowspan="2" | Best Performance Video
| 
|-
| rowspan="4" | 2013
| "Despair"
| 
|-
| rowspan="3" | "Sacrilege"
| Video of the Year
| 
|-
| Best Narrative
| 
|-
| Best Editing
| 

BMI London Awards

|-
| 2007
| "Gold Lion"
| Pop Award
| 

D&AD Awards

|-
| 2005
| "Y Control"
| Direction
| style="background:#FFBF00"| Yellow Pencil
|-
| rowspan=2|2014
| rowspan=2|"Sacrilege"
| Cinematography
| style="background:#BF8040"| Wood Pencil
|-
| Editing
| style="background:#8a8b89"| Graphite Pencil

Grammy Awards

|-
| style="text-align:center;"| 2004
| Fever to Tell
| rowspan="4"| Best Alternative Music Album
| 
|-
| style="text-align:center;"| 2007
| Show Your Bones
| 
|-
| style="text-align:center;"| 2010
| It's Blitz!
| 
|-
| style="text-align:center;" rowspan=2| 2023
| Cool It Down
| 
|-
| "Spitting Off the Edge of the World"
|Best Alternative Music Performance
| 
|-

International Dance Music Awards

|-
| rowspan="3"| 2010
| Themselves
| Best Artist (Group)
| 
|-
| It's Blitz
| Best Artist Album
| 
|-
| "Heads Will Roll"
| Best Alternative/Rock Dance Track
| 

MTV Video Music Awards

|-
| rowspan="4"|2004
| rowspan="4"|"Maps"
| Best Art Direction
|
|-
| Best Editing
|
|-
| Best Cinematography
|
|-
| MTV2 Award
|
|-
| 2009
| "Heads Will Roll"
| Breakthrough Video
|
|-
| rowspan="2"|2013
| rowspan="2"|"Sacrilege"
| Best Direction
|
|-
| Best Cinematography
|

MVPA Awards

|-
| 2005
| "Y Control"
| Best Alternative Video
| 
|-
| 2006
| "Gold Lion"
| Best Cinematography
| 
|-
| 2009
| "Zero"
| Best Rock Video
| 

mtvU Woodie Awards

|-
| 2004
| Themselves
| Woodie of the Year
| 
|-
| 2009
| "Heads Will Roll"
| Best Video Woodie
| 

NME Awards

|-
| rowspan="2"| 2003
| Themselves
| Philip Hall Hot New Band Award
|
|-
| rowspan="3"| Karen O
| rowspan="3"| Hottest Woman
|
|-
| 2005
|
|-
| 2007
|
|-
| rowspan="2"|2010
| "Zero"
| Best Dancefloor Filler
|
|-
| Themselves
| Best International Band
|
|-
| 2011
| Karen O
| Hottest Woman
|

New York Music Awards

|-
| 2011
| "Heads Will Roll" (A-Trak Remix)
| Best Dance Remix
| 

Rober Awards Music Poll

|-
| rowspan=4|2009
| rowspan=2|Themselves
| Best Rock Artist
| 
|-
| Band of the Year
| 
|-
| "Zero"
| Song of the Year
| 
|-
| "Heads Will Roll" (A-Trak Remix)
| Best Remix
| 

Shortlist Music Prize

|-
| 2003
| Fever to Tell
| Album of the Year
|

UK Music Video Awards

|-
| rowspan="2"|2013
| rowspan="2"|"Sacrilege"
| Best Rock/Indie Video
|
|-
| Best Editing
|

Žebřík Music Awards

!Ref.
|-
| rowspan=2|2009
| Karen O
| Best International Female
| 
| rowspan=2|
|-
| Themselves
| Best International Discovery
|

Discography

Studio albums
 Fever to Tell (2003)
 Show Your Bones (2006)
 It's Blitz! (2009)
 Mosquito (2013)
 Cool It Down (2022)

References

External links

 
 BBC artist page
 YYY Pins, early list of links to interviews, photos, etc.
 "Yeah Yeah Yeahs: The Love Cats", Exclaim!

 
2000 establishments in New York City
Alternative rock groups from New York (state)
American art rock groups
Dance-punk musical groups
Fiction Records artists
Indie rock musical groups from New York (state)
Interscope Records artists
Musical groups established in 2000
Musical groups from New York City
American musical trios
Modular Recordings artists
Polydor Records artists
Post-punk revival music groups
Touch and Go Records artists
Wichita Recordings artists
Female-fronted musical groups
Secretly Canadian artists